Oriomeryx is an extinct genus of the family Moschidae, endemic to Europe from the early Miocene epoch, approximately 20 Ma. Fossils are known only from a single site in Zaragoza, Spain.

References 

Prehistoric musk deer
Miocene even-toed ungulates
Miocene mammals of Europe
Prehistoric even-toed ungulate genera